Buck Creek is an unincorporated census-designated place in Washington Township, Tippecanoe County, in the U.S. state of Indiana.

It is part of the Lafayette, Indiana Metropolitan Statistical Area.

History
Buck Creek was originally called Transitville.

A post office was established under the name Transitville in 1858, and was renamed Buck Creek in 1885. , it remains in operation.

Geography
Buck Creek sits at the intersection of Tippecanoe County Road 750 East and a northeast-southwest Norfolk Southern railroad line between the cities of Lafayette and Delphi.  

Demographics
The population of Buck Creek in the 2020 US census is 182 and the population density is 1,378.79/sq mi.

Education
Public education for residents of Buck Creek is provided by the Tippecanoe School Corporation.

References

External links 

Census-designated places in Tippecanoe County, Indiana
Census-designated places in Indiana
Lafayette metropolitan area, Indiana